George Henshaw (born January 22, 1948) is a former American football coach. He was the head football coach at the University of Tulsa in 1987, where he compiled a record of 3–8. Henshaw also served as offensive coordinator for the Denver Broncos and New York Giants of the NFL. He played college football at West Virginia University between 1967 and 1969. From 1970 to 1975, he served as an assistant coach at West Virginia. He was also an offensive coordinator at the University of Alabama and Florida State University.

Head coaching record

Personal life
Henshaw and his wife Katherine have three children, Michael, Matthew and Kelly.

References

1948 births
Living people
Alabama Crimson Tide football coaches
American football defensive tackles
Denver Broncos coaches
Florida State Seminoles football coaches
New Orleans Saints coaches
New York Giants coaches
People from Chesterfield County, Virginia
Players of American football from Richmond, Virginia
Tennessee Titans coaches
Tulsa Golden Hurricane football coaches
West Virginia Mountaineers football players